Katsch may refer to:

Frojach-Katsch, a municipality in the district of Murau in Styria, Austria
Ruine Katsch, a castle in Styria, Austria

See also
Alexander Catsch